The Diocese of Ikot Ekpene is a Latin Church ecclesiastical territory or diocese of the Catholic Church. Its episcopal see is Ikot Ekpene, Akwa Ibom State. The Diocese of Ikot Ekpene is a suffragan diocese in the ecclesiastical province of the metropolitan Archdiocese of Calabar.

History
 March 1, 1963: Established as Diocese of Ikot Ekpene from the Diocese of Calabar

Special churches
The diocesan cathedral is Saint Anne Cathedral in Ikot Ekpene.  The pro-cathedral is Saint John Pro-Cathedral in Abak.

Bishops
 Bishops of Ikot Ekpene
 Bishop Dominic Ignatius Ekandem (1963.03.01 – 1989.06.19) (Cardinal in 1976), appointed Ecclesiastical Superior of Abuja in 1981 and Archbishop (personal title) there in 1989
 Bishop Camillus Archibong Etokudoh (from 1989.09.01 until May 4, 2009)
 Bishop Camillus Raymond Umoh (since 2010.10.09); born in 1956 in Nto Ubiam, ordained to the priesthood in 1984, formerly a Professor at the Catholic Institute of West Africa in Port Harcourt

Auxiliary Bishop
Camillus Archibong Etokudoh (1988-1989), appointed Bishop of Ikot Ekpene

Other priest of this diocese who became bishop
Donatus Edet Akpan, appointed Bishop of Ogoja in 2017

See also
Roman Catholicism in Nigeria

References

External links
 GCatholic.org Information
 Catholic Hierarchy

Ikot Ekpene
Ikot Ekpene
Christian organizations established in 1964
Roman Catholic dioceses and prelatures established in the 20th century